George A. Smith (March 8, 1825January 29, 1893) was a Michigan politician.

Early life
George A. Smith was born on March 8, 1825, in Danbury, Connecticut. In 1839 or 1840, his father, Azariel Smith, settled on a farm in Somerset Township, Michigan, south of the village of Gambleville. George started living in Gambleville around 1854 or 1855.

Career
Smith was a merchant. In 1860, Smith served as the supervisor of Somerset Township, a position his father Azariel held in 1841. On November 4, 1862, Smith was elected to the Michigan House of Representatives where he represented the Hillsdale County 3rd district from January 7, 1863, to December 31, 1864. On November 6, 1866, Smith was elected to the Michigan Senate where he represented the 12th district from January 2, 1867, to December 31, 1868. Sometime around 1879, Smith served as a postmaster in Somerset Township. On November 4, 1884, Smith was elected to the Michigan Senate where he represented the 9th district from January 7, 1885, to December 31, 1886.

Personal life
George A. Smith had a son named Le Grand Smith who lived in Azariel Smith's old farm sometime around 1879.

Death
Smith died on January 29, 1893, in Somerset Township.

References

1825 births
1893 deaths
Michigan postmasters
Farmers from Michigan
People from Hillsdale County, Michigan
Politicians from Danbury, Connecticut
Republican Party members of the Michigan House of Representatives
Republican Party Michigan state senators
19th-century American politicians